The Stratford Lyon is a legendary antlered lion from the folklore of the New Forest in England. The story takes place primarily in South Baddesley and nearby Boldre, but incorporates most of the New Forest area. In the mid to late 20th century, it accrued a number of related alien big cat sightings, and is especially associated with the Red Lion pub in Boldre.

Legend
The local tradition is that John de Stratford, a young aristocrat related to the former Bishop of Winchester, was surveying his recently inherited lands in the New Forest. Whilst riding through a wood called Haresmede, north of South Baddesley, he discovered a large pair of stag-like antlers sticking out of the earth. Dismounting, he started pulling at the antlers, until eventually they began to give way, and Stratford saw that the antlers were attached to a giant head. He continued pulling until the entire creature was uprooted, though it struggled and fought as he did so. The monster charged at Stratford, who was able to dodge the attack, and using the antlers climbed onto the lion's back. It bucked and charged three times around the boundary of the forest, attempting to throw its rider, before finally Stratford wrestled it into submission and tamed the beast. It then pledged its service to Stratford and his family.

Appearance
All accounts agree that the lion is red, possesses large, pronged stag-like antlers, and is of a prodigious size. Usually emphasised are the large eyes, sometimes described as being yellow or "like saucers", and large teeth, sometimes described as fangs and sometimes as tusks. The mane of the lion is usually described as especially impressive and wild.

Sources and influence
The documentary version of this tradition is contained in the margin of a Stratford family bible dating to the 18th century. The historical John de Stratford inherited his father's and grandfather's lands (including Haresmede) in 1401, and a small example of mediaeval graffiti in the Boldre parish church depicts an antlered lion. There is some evidence that the symbol of the Stratford Lyon was used in the heraldry of the Stratford family.

The Lymington author and publisher Henry Doman wrote a verse ballade of the legend in the mid-19th century, and tradition holds that the Red Lion pub in Boldre was named after the creature. The association with the pub goes back to at least the late 18th century, when a large pair of antlers on the wall of the pub were reputed to have been shed by the monster. Prior to the Second World War, a small statuette depicting the lion was kept on the bar, and Doman's poem was framed on the wall, with "the Stratford" used as a nickname for the pub.

Modern sightings
In the 1960s, sightings of a red, antlered alien big cat in the proximity of the Red Lion pub were reported, and ascribed to the Stratford Lyon. Sightings spread throughout the New Forest area, and continued into the 1990s. They include accounts of the lion peering in at windows, watching from a distance, charging to attack, or racing through the landscape with the ghost of John de Stratford on its back. It was believed that the lion appeared on the birth and death of every Stratford, or in some accounts whenever the family met with triumph or disaster. The most recent sighting was in 2021, as reported by the New Milton Advertiser & Times.

References

English folklore
English legendary creatures
Hampshire folklore
History of Hampshire
Monsters
New Forest
New Forest folklore
Purported mammals
Stratford family